Eidolon (known as the palm bat)  is a genus of megabats in the family Pteropodidae. It contains two species:

Madagascan fruit bat, Eidolon dupreanum
Straw-coloured fruit bat, Eidolon helvum

References

 
Bat genera
Taxa named by Constantine Samuel Rafinesque